The Abdullah restaurant bombing was a terrorist attack that was committed during the Second Iraq War on 11 December 2008. The attack involved a suicide bomber who blew himself up in a crowded restaurant outside of Kirkuk in Northern Iraq. The attack killed at least 55 people. At least 100 people were also injured in the blast.

References

External links
BBC pictures of the attack

2008 murders in Iraq
Explosions in 2008
Suicide bombings in Iraq
Attacks on restaurants in Asia
2008 in Iraq
Kirkuk
Terrorist incidents in Iraq in 2008
December 2008 events in Iraq
Building bombings in Iraq
21st century in Kirkuk